Pteroplatus nigriventris is a species of beetle in the family Cerambycidae. It was described by Breme in 1844.

References

Pteroplatini
Beetles described in 1844